Three Tidy Tigers Tied a Tie Tighter (lit. "Three Sad Tigers") is a Brazilian drama film, directed by Gustavo Vinagre and released in 2022. The film centres on three young queer people in São Paulo who are exploring the city, against the context of a viral pandemic that infects the brain and impairs memory.

The cast includes Isabella Pereira, Jonata Vieira, Pedro Ribeiro, Gilda Nomacce, Carlos Escher, Julia Katharine, Ivana Wonder, Cida Moreira, Everaldo Pontes, Nilceia Vicente.

The film premiered in the Forum program at the 72nd Berlin International Film Festival, where it was the winner of the Teddy Award for best LGBTQ-themed feature film. The film was the winner of the Pink Dragon Jury Award at the 38th Ljubljana LGBT Film Festival.

Cast
 Isabella Pereira
 Jonata Vieira
 Pedro Ribeiro
 Gilda Nomacce
 Carlos Escher
 Julia Katharine
 Ivana Wonder
 Cida Moreira
 Everaldo Pontes
 Nilceia Vicente
 Inês Brasil

References

External links

2022 films
2022 drama films
2022 LGBT-related films
Brazilian drama films
Brazilian LGBT-related films
LGBT-related drama films
Films about viral outbreaks
2020s Portuguese-language films
Films set in São Paulo